The NAIA Women's Soccer Championship is the annual tournament to determine the national champions of NAIA women's collegiate soccer in the United States and Canada. It has been held annually since 1984.

The most successful program is Westmont (CA), with 5 NAIA national titles. 

Spring Arbor won their third overall national title in May 2022.

Results

Cumulative results

 Schools highlighted in pink are closed or no longer sponsor athletics.
 Schools highlight in yellow have reclassified athletics from the NAIA.

See also
NAIA Men's Soccer Championship
NCAA Women's Soccer Championships (Division I, Division II, Division III)
NCAA Men's Soccer Championships (Division I, Division II, Division III)

References

External links
 

Soccer, W
College soccer competitions in the United States
Women's soccer competitions in the United States
College women's soccer in the United States